The Following is a table which gives a basic overview of the beliefs of a selection of the Republican presidential candidates (including undeclared candidates and candidates with exploratory committees.)

Color Coding 

█ = Declared Candidates

█ = Candidates with Exploratory Committees

█ = Potential candidates (undeclared)

Candidate Breakdown

Abortion 
Note: The NARAL Rating is a tool used by the "Pro-Choice" camp that gauges how "Pro-Choice" or "pro-life" currently elected officials are (logically, the most current ratings would not apply to candidates not currently in office). This measure is taken by a partisan organization and its limitations should be acknowledged as such.
{{PoliGOPTable
|NARALRating

|Is pro-life, and supports a "consistent life ethic."
|SPONSORED the Partial-Birth Abortion Ban Act of 1999
|0% (Pro-Life)
|"Life is worthy of respect and protection from the moment of conception...I believe every life has meaning and purpose, and that the termination of life is taken too lightly in our country today. Abortion ends a human life. It destroys an individual who could have lived, worked, and contributed to our society. And has wiped out nearly an entire generation... I will continue to fight to protect life at every stage. I hope that one day America will remember the value we once placed on human life."

|Is pro-life, but is unsure how a ban on abortion should be put into effect.
|"I think that abortion should not be legal, and I think that how you would implement that I'm not sure."

|Is personally against abortion. However, a woman has the right to choose.

Believes that only the Supreme Court can overturn Roe v. Wade

Supports public funding for abortion.
|"I hate [abortion] ... However, I believe in a woman's right to choose."
"There must be public funding for abortions for poor women.... We cannot deny any woman the right to make her own decisions about abortion."

|Reportedly supports a constitutional amendment banning abortion, but has said he would leave it to the states.
|"First of all, it should be left to the states."
"My convictions regarding the sanctity of human life are clear and consistent. They have been articulated as well as formulated into public policy without equivocation or wavering. I often say I did not become pro-life because of politics but rather I became involved in politics in large measure because of my strong pro-life convictions."

|Hunter is adamantly pro-life, and believes that abortion should be banned through a Constitutional amendment. Has sought to implement the 14th amendment to humans in all states of life.
|WROTE H. R. 618, a bill seeking to implement the equal protection clause of the 14th Amendment to humans at all stages of life.
|0% (Pro-life)
|"Our greatest obligation as elected leaders is to protect the American people, especially those who are incapable of protecting themselves."

|Is pro-life, with rape and incest exceptions.
|0% (Pro-life)
|"I don't think a constitutional amendment is probably going to take place.... Just as I believe that the issue of gay marriage should be decided by the states, so do I believe that we would be better off by having Roe v. Wade return to the states."

|While originally supporting abortion, Romney became pro-life in 2004. Opposes constitutional amendment banning abortion. Says to let the states decide.
|"My own view is that abortion is not right. But states should be able to make their own decisions rather than have a single pronouncement by the federal government."

"Life, from a scientific standpoint, begins at conception. I don't know when the soul, if you're religious, when the soul enters the body. My church doesn't teach that by the way, doesn't have an opinion on it. So I don't know when it does."

"I believe women should have the right to make their own choice."

|Believes in passing a constitutional amendment banning abortion, while pulling in the power of the judiciary. Is in favor of legislation requiring parental notification when a minor seeks an abortion.
|VOTED FOR the Partial-Birth Abortion Ban Act.Voted AGAINST human embryonic stem cell research.
|0% (Pro-Life)
|"As a devout Christian, father, and grandfather, I am a strong believer in the right to life for the unborn child. For years, activist judges have undermined life. As president, I would stop this by appointing strict constructionists as judges, reining in the power of the judiciary, and supporting constitutional amendments that respect life."

|Opposes a human life amendment. Believes that Roe v. Wade should be addressed by good judges.<ref name=autogenerated3>

 Ron Paul supports life and opposes abortion. He believes the states should be allowed to pass laws governing abortion.

Immigration
The ABI rating is a rating given by an organization called Americans For Better Immigration, that   "lobbies Congress for reductions in immigration numbers." and gauges how politicians currently in office have voted in accordance with their position. This measure is taken by a partisan organization and its limitations should be acknowledged as such.

 Ron Paul believes we must secure our borders now and that a nation without secure borders is no nation at all. He thinks it is senseless to fight terrorists abroad when our own front door is left unlocked.

War on Terror

 Ron Paul opposes the continued occupation of Iraq.  He believe the military actions were not approved by Congress as a declaration of war and are unconstitutional.

Sources